UFC on Fox: Jacaré vs. Brunson 2 (also known as UFC on Fox 27) was a mixed martial arts event produced by the Ultimate Fighting Championship held on January 27, 2018, at Spectrum Center in Charlotte, North Carolina, United States.

Background
The event marked the promotion's fourth visit to Charlotte, and first since UFC Fight Night: Florian vs. Gomi in March 2010.

A middleweight rematch between former Strikeforce Middleweight Champion Ronaldo Souza and Derek Brunson served as the event headliner. The pairing met previously in August 2012 under the Strikeforce banner with Souza winning the fight via knockout in the first round.

Ilir Latifi was expected to face former interim UFC Light Heavyweight Championship challenger Ovince Saint Preux at the event. However, on January 16, Latifi pulled out due to injury and the bout was scrapped. The pairing was then rescheduled for UFC on Fox: Emmett vs. Stephens.

Results

Bonus awards
The following fighters were awarded $50,000 bonuses:
Fight of the Night: Drew Dober vs. Frank Camacho
Performance of the Night: Ronaldo Souza and Mirsad Bektić

See also

List of UFC events
2018 in UFC
List of current UFC fighters

References

Fox UFC
Events in Charlotte, North Carolina
2018 in mixed martial arts
January 2018 sports events in the United States
Sports competitions in Charlotte, North Carolina
2018 in sports in North Carolina